The North Yuba River (also called the North Fork Yuba River) is the main tributary of the Yuba River in northern California in the United States.

The river flows west through meadows, then south into a gorge, turning west again, followed by California State Route 49. The river's four major tributaries, the Downie River, Goodyears Creek, Canyon Creek and Slate Creek, enter from the right before the river abruptly turns south at the New Bullards Bar Reservoir, formed by the New Bullards Bar Dam. The dam is situated right above the river's mouth; just after the North Yuba leaves the dam it empties into the Middle Yuba River and forms the Yuba River.

References

External links

Rivers of Nevada County, California
Rivers of Yuba County, California
Tahoe National Forest
Tributaries of the Feather River
Downieville, California
Rivers of Northern California